Ngāti Huia is a hapū (subtribe) of the Ngāti Raukawa iwi (Māori tribe) of New Zealand. The leading chief of Ngāti Huia and Ngāti Raukawa in the 1820s to 1840s was Te Whatanui, who led part of Ngāti Raukawa from their traditional lands in the south Waikato to the Kapiti Coast.

See also
List of Māori iwi